The Syrian Salvation Government is a de facto alternative government of the Syrian opposition in Idlib Governorate, formed in early November 2017. There followed weeks of conflict between the Syrian Salvation Government (SSG) and the Syrian Interim Government (SIG), with reports of Hayat Tahrir al-Sham (HTS) unilaterally disbanding several SIG-supported local councils across northwestern Syria. The SSG is led by a prime minister (currently Ali Keda, since 18 November 2019) who is elected by a legislative body named the General Shura Council, which is headed by a president (currently Mustafa al-Mousa, since 24 April 2020).

Background
Since 2014, large parts of Idlib Governorate, including Idlib City, in Northwest Syria have been largely in the military control of the al-Qaeda-linked al-Nusra Front which would later go on to form Hayat Tahrir al-Sham (HTS) along with five other groups, who have been at war with other rebel fighters, including the Free Syrian Army, and with the Syrian opposition more generally. HTS does not recognise the authority of the official opposition leadership, the National Coalition for Syrian Revolutionary and Opposition Forces, or its recognised government, the Syrian Interim Government. However, HTS generally removed itself from the day to day governance of territories it held, leading to a form of dual power in which civil administration was carried out by co-operatively-run local councils. Throughout 2017, HTS had been engaged in particularly intense armed conflict with rival rebel groups - see Idlib Governorate clashes (January–March 2017) and Idlib Governorate clashes (July 2017).

History

The General Syrian Conference, held in Idlib in September 2017, was a continuation of the Civil Administration Initiative in opposition-controlled areas, held at the end of August 2017 in Idlib. At its conclusion on 11 September 2017, the Conference formed a constituent body named the General Shura Council, headed by president Bassam al-Sahyouni, and appointed a prime minister. The Syrian Interim Government rejected the outcome of the conference; its president, Jawad Abu Hatab, called it “a declaration of the “Idlibstan” project. The Syrian Democratic Forces in Qamishli and Afrin also rejected it. Conference participants agreed upon “Islamic law as the only source of legislation", "the need to preserve the identity of the Syrian Muslim people”, “the overthrow of the illegal regime with all its symbols and pillars and holding it accountable for its committed crimes, as well as liberating the Syrian territory from all the occupying forces, extending security and spreading justice in the liberated areas”.

The move was seen as part of an attempt by Tahrir al-Sham to impose its control on the region. Riad al-Asaad's attendance at the conference was controversial. Riad al-Asaad said that “Tahrir al-Sham has previously declared that it will be dissolve itself, which is an external and internal demand”, and that HTS “did not attend the conference and we did not communicate with them after it ended, either”. However, the Hawar Kilis Operations Room, part of the Syrian National Army, condemned Riad al-Asaad and accused him of conspiring with Al-Qaida.

In early November 2017, the General Conference formed the Syrian Salvation Government. There followed weeks of conflict between the new government and the Syrian Interim Government (SIG), with reports of HTS unilaterally disbanding several SIG-supported local councils across northwestern Syria.

On 12 December 2017, the Syrian Salvation Government issued a warning that called for the Syrian Interim Government to evacuate their offices from opposition-controlled areas in 72 hours. There were reports that some SIG-run local councils had already been closed, and replaced by SSG-loyal alternatives, but others said they would not vacate their offices.

On 6 January 2018, the Salvation Government declared control over the SIG-initiated Free Aleppo University, and closed several faculties in al-Dana and Sarmada, north of Idlib, where almost 4,000 students study. This resulted in protests by students and lecturers of the university against the group.On 11 March 2018, Russian planes reportedly fired a missile on the SSG Ministry of Justice east of Idlib city.

On 15 August 2018, the SSG's Founding Body accepted the oral resignation of Prime Minister Mohammed al-Sheikh after the kidnapping of a prominent health director. Although the director was ransomed for $US100,000, al-Sheikh had promised to resign if the Ministry of Interior failed to apprehend the captors within 24 hours. On 18 August 2018, the Founding Body instructed Fawaz Hilal to form a new government with the deputy prime minister, Mohammed Jamal Shahoud, leading in the interim. The SSG's Constitution Drafting Assembly appointed Fawaz Hilal as prime minister, alongside nine cabinet ministers, on 10 December 2018. Hilal and much of his cabinet maintained close ties with Tahrir al-Sham.

On 29 January 2019, a female suicide bomber accused by Hayat Tahrir al-Sham of being linked to ISIL attacked the headquarters of the Salvation Government. After fighting guards outside the facility for several minutes, she blew herself up, wounding a number of people. Two days later ISIL denied they were responsible for the attack, using their media outlet Amaq News Agency.

During a government offensive on Idlib in May 2019, Hilal called upon Turkey to support the opposition.

Tax increases, rising commodity prices and accusations that the SSG was establishing monopolies on key goods such as fuel led to protests between October and November 2019, with demonstrators chanting slogans against the SSG and Abu Mohammad al-Julani. After residents of Kafr Takharim refused to pay a new tax on olive oil and expelled SSG officials, Tahrir al-Sham fighters besieged and bombed the town, killing 5. Hilal and his cabinet resigned shortly afterwards, leading to the General Shura Council asking Ali Keda, Deputy Minister of the Interior for Administrative Affairs and Public Relations, to form a new government. On 18 November 2019, Keda was elected prime minister by the Council, winning 65% of the vote. However, some activists said the reshuffle was merely "changing faces".

On 23 March 2020, the SSG created an emergency committee to coordinate its response to the COVID-19 pandemic in Syria. Measures taken by the SSG to prevent the spread of COVID-19 included suspending Friday prayers, shutting down schools and markets and opening quarantine centres in Jisr al-Shughur, Sarmada and Kafr Karmin. However, these efforts were undermined by hardliners from Tahrir al-Sham and al-Qaeda's Syrian branch, the Guardians of Religion Organization, who continued to pray and hold sermons in mosques without social distancing. As of 26 March 2020, the SSG possessed limited resources to deal with a large outbreak of COVID-19, with only 107 ventilators and 243 intensive care unit beds at its disposal.

On 7 April 2020, Bassam al-Sahyouni, president of the General Shura Council, resigned. Sources told Enab Baladi that his resignation was in response to attempts by HTS to interfere in the Council's activities. On 24 April 2020, the Council elected Mustafa al-Mousa, a pharmacist who previously headed its health committee, as his successor.

In May 2020, rapid depreciation of the Syrian pound triggered by the US Government's Caesar Syria Civilian Protection Act prompted the SSG to replace it with the Turkish lira in its administered territories.

On 1 December 2020, Ali Keda was re-elected as prime minister for another term by the General Shura Council, receiving 81% of the vote. The appointment was criticized by opposition activists, who likened it to elections in territories controlled by the Syrian government.

Structure
Mohammed al-Sheikh was initially appointed as prime minister, alongside 11 ministers for Interior, Justice, Endowment, Higher Education, Education, Health, Agriculture, Economy, Social Affairs and Displaced, Housing and Reconstruction and Local Administration and Services. Al-Sheikh, in a press conference held at the Bab al-Hawa Border Crossing also announced the formation of four commissions: Inspection Authority, Prisoners and Missing Persons Affairs, Planning and Statistics Authority, and the Commission of Trade Unions. The founder of the Free Syrian Army, Col. Riad al-Asaad, was appointed as deputy prime minister for military affairs. After the appointment of Fawaz Hilal as prime minister in December 2018, the Ministry of Economy was merged with the Ministry of Agriculture and the Ministry of Housing and Reconstruction was merged with the Ministry of Local Administration and Services.

List of prime ministers

List of ministers in 2017

See also
Ebaa News Agency - News agency that reports favorably toward the Salvation Government
Politics of Syria
Watad Petroleum
National Salvation Government

References

External links

  

2017 establishments in Syria
Syrian opposition
Anti-government factions of the Syrian civil war